Matthias Ruländer (born 16 August 1964) is a German former professional footballer who played as a centre-back. He spent five seasons in the Bundesliga with SV Werder Bremen and Borussia Dortmund.

Honours
 Bundesliga: 1987–88; runners-up 1985–86
 DFB-Pokal: 1988–89

References

External links
 
 Profile at DFB

Living people
1964 births
Association football defenders
German footballers
Germany under-21 international footballers
SV Werder Bremen players
SV Werder Bremen II players
FC St. Pauli players
Borussia Dortmund players
Atlas Delmenhorst players
Bundesliga players
2. Bundesliga players